Queen Sirikit National Convention Centre MRT station (code BL23) or QSNCC station is a Bangkok MRT station on the Blue Line. Located under Ratchadaphisek Road, near Queen Sirikit National Convention Centre, Benjakitti Park, PAT Stadium and Khlong Toei Market.

Station details 
Use symbol as Queen Sirikit National Convention Centre's buildings and colour is yellow. It is an underground station, width 23 metres, length 196 metres, depth 20 metres, and uses an island platform.

There is a MetroMall in the station.

References 

MRT (Bangkok) stations
Railway stations opened in 2004
2004 establishments in Thailand